The William H. Norwood House is a historic house at 1602 West Main Street in Russellville, Arkansas.  It is a two-story frame structure, finished in red brick veneer and covered by a hip roof.  The main block of the building is extending to the side and rear by single-story extensions, one of which includes an enclosed rear porch.  The house was built in 1917 for William H. Norwood, a local merchant.  It is a rare surviving example in the community of a large-scale residence with high quality Craftsman and Prairie School features.  The area where it stands was once predominantly residential, but has in recent years become more commercial.  The house is now occupied by professional offices.

The house was listed on the National Register of Historic Places in 2019.

See also
National Register of Historic Places listings in Pope County, Arkansas

References

Houses on the National Register of Historic Places in Arkansas
National Register of Historic Places in Pope County, Arkansas
Houses completed in 1917
Houses in Pope County, Arkansas
Buildings and structures in Russellville, Arkansas
1917 establishments in Arkansas
Prairie School architecture in Arkansas
American Craftsman architecture in Arkansas